Community Bank is a commercial bank serving customers in Oregon and Washington. The bank is headquartered in Joseph, Oregon.

History
Community Bank was founded in May 1955 by Joseph, Oregon business leaders. At that time, the bank was named "Bank of Wallowa County". The bank's name was changed to Community Bank in 1991, when the bank expanded out of Wallowa County into Pendleton, Oregon. Currently the bank operates 13 full-service branches, 10 in Northeastern Oregon and 3 in Southeastern Washington.

Communities 
Community Bank has branches in the cities of Baker City, Oregon, Clarkston, Washington, Elgin, Oregon, Enterprise, Oregon, Hermiston, Oregon, Joseph, Oregon, La Grande, Oregon, Milton-Freewater, Oregon, Pendleton, Oregon, Walla Walla, Washington and Wallowa, Oregon.

References

www.communitybanknet.com
www.fdic.gov - cert # 17445

Banks based in Oregon
Banks based in Washington (state)
Privately held companies based in Oregon
Joseph, Oregon
Banks established in 1955
1955 establishments in Oregon